Diogenes, also known as Diogenes the Cynic or Diogenes of Sinope, was a Greek philosopher and one of the founders of Cynicism. He was born in Sinope, an Ionian colony on the Black Sea coast of Anatolia in 412 or 404 BC and died at Corinth in 323 BC.

Diogenes was a controversial figure. He was allegedly banished, or fled from, Sinope for debasement of currency.  He was the son of the mintmaster of Sinope, and there is some debate as to whether or not he alone had debased the Sinopian currency, whether his father had done this, or whether they had both done it. After his hasty departure from Sinope he moved to Athens where he proceeded to criticize many conventions of Athens of that day. There are many tales about his dogging Antisthenes' footsteps and becoming his "faithful hound". Diogenes was captured by pirates and sold into slavery, eventually settling in Corinth. There he passed his philosophy of Cynicism to Crates, who taught it to Zeno of Citium, who fashioned it into the school of Stoicism, one of the most enduring schools of Greek philosophy. 

No writings of Diogenes survive, but there are some details of his life from anecdotes (chreia), especially from Diogenes Laërtius' book Lives and Opinions of Eminent Philosophers and some other sources. Diogenes made a virtue of poverty. He begged for a living and often slept in a large ceramic jar, or pithos, in the marketplace. He used his simple lifestyle and behavior to criticize the social values and institutions of what he saw as a corrupt, confused society. He had a reputation for sleeping and eating wherever he chose in a highly non-traditional fashion and took to toughening himself against nature. He declared himself a cosmopolitan and a citizen of the world rather than claiming allegiance to just one place. 

He modeled himself on the example of Heracles, believing that virtue was better revealed in action than in theory. He became notorious for his philosophical stunts, such as carrying a lamp during the day, claiming to be looking for a "man" (often rendered in English as "looking for an honest man"). He criticized Plato, disputed his interpretation of Socrates, and sabotaged his lectures, sometimes distracting listeners by bringing food and eating during the discussions. Diogenes was also noted for having mocked Alexander the Great, both in public and to his face when he visited Corinth in 336 BC.

Life
Nothing is known about Diogenes's early life except that his father, Hicesias, was a banker. It seems likely that Diogenes was also enrolled into the banking business aiding his father.

At some point (the exact date is unknown), Hicesias and Diogenes became involved in a scandal involving the adulteration or debasement of the currency, and Diogenes was exiled from the city and lost his citizenship and all his material possessions. This aspect of the story seems to be corroborated by archaeology: large numbers of defaced coins (smashed with a large chisel stamp) have been discovered at Sinope dating from the middle of the 4th century BC, and other coins of the time bear the name of Hicesias as the official who minted them. During this time there was much counterfeit money circulating in Sinope. The coins were deliberately defaced in order to render them worthless as legal tender. Sinope was being disputed between pro-Persian and pro-Greek factions in the 4th century, and there may have been political rather than financial motives behind the act.

Athens 

According to one story, Diogenes went to the Oracle at Delphi to ask for her advice and was told that he should "deface the currency". Following the debacle in Sinope, Diogenes decided that the oracle meant that he should deface the political currency rather than actual coins. He traveled to Athens and made it his life's goal to challenge established customs and values. He argued that instead of being troubled about the true nature of evil, people merely rely on customary interpretations. Diogenes arrived in Athens with a slave named Manes who escaped from him shortly thereafter. With characteristic humor, Diogenes dismissed his ill fortune by saying, "If Manes can live without Diogenes, why not Diogenes without Manes?"  Diogenes would mock such a relation of extreme dependency. He found the figure of a master who could do nothing for himself contemptibly helpless. He was attracted by the ascetic teaching of Antisthenes, a student of Socrates. When Diogenes asked Antisthenes to mentor him, Antisthenes ignored him and reportedly "eventually beat him off with his staff". Diogenes responded, "Strike, for you will find no wood hard enough to keep me away from you, so long as I think you've something to say." Diogenes became Antisthenes's pupil, despite the brutality with which he was initially received.  Whether the two ever really met is still uncertain, but he surpassed his master in both reputation and the austerity of his life. He considered his avoidance of earthly pleasures a contrast to and commentary on contemporary Athenian behaviors. This attitude was grounded in a disdain for what he regarded as the folly, pretence, vanity, self-deception, and artificiality of human conduct.

The stories told of Diogenes illustrate the logical consistency of his character. He inured himself to the weather by living in a clay wine jar belonging to the temple of Cybele. He destroyed the single wooden bowl he possessed on seeing a peasant boy drink from the hollow of his hands. He then exclaimed: "Fool that I am, to have been carrying superfluous baggage all this time!" It was contrary to Athenian customs to eat within the marketplace, and still he would eat there, for, as he explained when rebuked, it was during the time he was in the marketplace that he felt hungry. He used to stroll about in full daylight with a lamp; when asked what he was doing, he would answer, "I am looking for a man." (Modern sources often say that Diogenes was looking for an "honest man", but in ancient sources he is simply "looking for a man" – . In his view, the unreasoning behavior of the people around him meant that they did not qualify as men.) Diogenes looked for a man but reputedly found nothing but rascals and scoundrels. Diogenes taught by living example. He tried to demonstrate that wisdom and happiness belong to the man who is independent of society and that civilization is regressive. He scorned not only family and socio-political organization, but also property rights and reputation. He even rejected normal ideas about human decency. Diogenes is said to have eaten in the marketplace, urinated on some people who insulted him, defecated in the theatre, and masturbated in public, and pointed at people with his middle finger, which was considered insulting. When asked about his eating in public he said, "If taking breakfast is nothing out of place, then it is nothing out of place in the marketplace." On the indecency of his masturbating in public he would say, "If only it were as easy to banish hunger by rubbing my belly."

Diogenes had nothing but disdain for Plato and his abstract philosophy. Diogenes viewed Antisthenes as the true heir to Socrates, and shared his love of virtue and indifference to wealth, together with a disdain for general opinion. Diogenes shared Socrates's belief that he could function as doctor to men's souls and improve them morally, while at the same time holding contempt for their obtuseness. Plato once described Diogenes as "a Socrates gone mad." According to Diogenes Laërtius, when Plato gave the tongue-in-cheek definition of man as "featherless bipeds", Diogenes plucked a chicken and brought it into Plato's Academy, saying, "Behold! I've brought you a man", and so the academy added "with broad flat nails" to the definition. Diogenes Laërtius also relates a number of more bawdy tales whereby Diogenes would spit, urinate on people, fart, and masturbate in public.

Corinth 
According to a story which seems to have originated with Menippus of Gadara, Diogenes was captured by pirates while on voyage to Aegina and sold as a slave in Crete to a Corinthian named Xeniades. Being asked his trade, he replied that he knew no trade but that of governing men, and that he wished to be sold to a man who needed a master. Xeniades liked his spirit and hired Diogenes to tutor his children. As tutor to Xeniades's two sons, it is said that he lived in Corinth for the rest of his life, which he devoted to preaching the doctrines of virtuous self-control. There are many stories about what actually happened to him after his time with Xeniades's two sons. There are stories stating he was set free after he became "a cherished member of the household", while one says he was set free almost immediately, and still another states that "he grew old and died at Xeniades's house in Corinth." He is even said to have lectured to large audiences at the Isthmian Games. Although most of the stories about his living in a jar are located in Athens, Lucian recounts a tale where he lived in a jar near the gymnasium in Corinth.

It was in Corinth that a meeting between Alexander the Great and Diogenes is supposed to have taken place. These stories may be apocryphal. The accounts of Plutarch and Diogenes Laërtius recount that they exchanged only a few words: while Diogenes was relaxing in the morning sunlight, Alexander, thrilled to meet the famous philosopher, asked if there was any favour he might do for him. Diogenes replied, "Yes, stand out of my sunlight." Alexander then declared, "If I were not Alexander, then I should wish to be Diogenes."  To which Diogenes replied, "If I were not Diogenes, I would still wish to be Diogenes". In another account of the conversation, Alexander found the philosopher looking attentively at a pile of human bones. Diogenes explained, "I am searching for the bones of your father but cannot distinguish them from those of a slave."

Death 
There are conflicting accounts of Diogenes's death. His contemporaries alleged he had held his breath until he expired; although other accounts of his death say he had become ill from eating raw octopus; or to have suffered an infected dog bite. When asked how he wished to be buried, he left instructions to be thrown outside the city wall so wild animals could feast on his body. When asked if he minded this, he said, "Not at all, as long as you provide me with a stick to chase the creatures away!" When asked how he could use the stick since he would lack awareness, he replied: "If I lack awareness, then why should I care what happens to me when I am dead?" To the end, Diogenes made fun of people's excessive concern with the "proper" treatment of the dead. The Corinthians erected to his memory a pillar on which rested a dog of Parian marble.

Philosophy
Along with Antisthenes and Crates of Thebes, Diogenes is considered one of the founders of Cynicism. The ideas of Diogenes, like those of most other Cynics, must be arrived at indirectly. No writings of Diogenes survive even though he is reported to have authored over ten books, a volume of letters and seven tragedies. Cynic ideas are inseparable from Cynic practice; therefore what we know about Diogenes is contained in anecdotes concerning his life and sayings attributed to him in a number of scattered classical sources.

Many anecdotes of Diogenes refer to his dog-like behavior, and his praise of a dog's virtues. It is not known whether Diogenes was insulted with the epithet "doggish" and made a virtue of it, or whether he first took up the dog theme himself. When asked why he was called a dog he replied, "I fawn on those who give me anything, I yelp at those who refuse, and I set my teeth in rascals." The term "cynic" itself derives from the Greek word κυνικός, kynikos, "dog-like" and that from κύων, kyôn, "dog" (genitive: kynos). One explanation offered in ancient times for why the Cynics were called dogs was that Antisthenes taught in the Cynosarges gymnasium at Athens. The word Cynosarges means the place of the white dog. Later Cynics also sought to turn the word to their advantage, as a later commentator explained:

There are four reasons why the Cynics are so named. First because of the indifference of their way of life, for they make a cult of indifference and, like dogs, eat and make love in public, go barefoot, and sleep in tubs and at crossroads. The second reason is that the dog is a shameless animal, and they make a cult of shamelessness, not as being beneath modesty, but as superior to it. The third reason is that the dog is a good guard, and they guard the tenets of their philosophy. The fourth reason is that the dog is a discriminating animal which can distinguish between its friends and enemies. So do they recognize as friends those who are suited to philosophy, and receive them kindly, while those unfitted they drive away, like dogs, by barking at them.

Diogenes believed human beings live artificially and hypocritically and would do well to study the dog. Besides performing natural body functions in public with ease, a dog will eat anything, and make no fuss about where to sleep. Dogs live in the present without anxiety, and have no use for the pretensions of abstract philosophy. In addition to these virtues, dogs are thought to know instinctively who is friend and who is foe. Unlike human beings who either dupe others or are duped, dogs will give an honest bark at the truth. Diogenes stated that "other dogs bite their enemies, I bite my friends to save them." Diogenes maintained that all the artificial growths of society were incompatible with happiness and that morality implies a return to the simplicity of nature. So great was his austerity and simplicity that the Stoics would later claim him to be a wise man or "sophos". In his words, "Humans have complicated every simple gift of the gods." Although Socrates had previously identified himself as belonging to the world, rather than a city, Diogenes is credited with the first known use of the word "cosmopolitan". When he was asked from where he came, he replied, "I am a citizen of the world (cosmopolites)".. This was a radical claim in a world where a man's identity was intimately tied to his citizenship of a particular city-state. An exile and an outcast, a man with no social identity, Diogenes made a mark on his contemporaries.

Legacy

Depictions in art
Both in ancient and in modern times, Diogenes's personality has appealed strongly to sculptors and to painters. Ancient busts exist in the museums of the Vatican, the Louvre, and the Capitol. The interview between Diogenes and Alexander is represented in an ancient marble bas-relief found in the Villa Albani. In Raphael's fresco The School of Athens, a lone reclining figure in the foreground represents Diogenes.

The many allusions to dogs in Shakespeare's Timon of Athens are references to the school of Cynicism that could be interpreted as suggesting a parallel between the misanthropic hermit, Timon, and Diogenes; but Shakespeare would have had access to Michel de Montaigne's essay, "Of Democritus and Heraclitus", which emphasised their differences: Timon actively wishes men ill and shuns them as dangerous, whereas Diogenes esteems them so little that contact with them could not disturb him. "Timonism" is in fact often contrasted with "Cynicism": "Cynics saw what people could be and were angered by what they had become; Timonists felt humans were hopelessly stupid & uncaring by nature and so saw no hope for change."

The philosopher's name was adopted by the fictional Diogenes Club, an organization that Sherlock Holmes' brother Mycroft Holmes belongs to in the story "The Greek Interpreter" by Sir Arthur Conan Doyle. It is called such as its members are educated, yet untalkative and have a dislike of socialising, much like the philosopher himself. "

Psychology

Diogenes's name has been applied to a behavioural disorder characterised by apparently involuntary self-neglect and hoarding. The disorder afflicts the elderly and is quite inappropriately named, as Diogenes deliberately rejected common standards of material comfort, and was anything but a hoarder. The name itself is also often criticised as Diogenes believed he was helping himself.

References

Sources 
 Desmond, William D. 2008. Cynics. Acumen / University of California Press.
 
 (Contains 124 sayings of Diogenes)

Further reading
 
 
 
 
 Hard, Robin (2012). Diogenes the Cynic: Sayings and Anecdotes, With Other Popular Moralists, Oxford University Press.

External links 

 
 Lives & Writings on the Cynics, directory of literary references to Ancient Cynics
 A day with Diogenes
 Diogenes The Dog from Millions of Mouths
 Diogenes of Sinope
 James Grout: Diogenes the Cynic, part of the Encyclopædia Romana

 
410s BC births
323 BC deaths
4th-century BC philosophers
Ancient Greek bankers
Ancient Greek ethicists
Ancient Greek slaves and freedmen
Ancient Pontic Greeks
Ascetics
Cosmopolitanism
Cynic philosophers
Metic philosophers in Classical Athens
People from Sinop, Turkey
Philosophers and tutors of Alexander the Great